The 1976 Los Angeles Dodgers finished the season in second place in the Western Division of the National League. The big news was when long-time manager of two decades Walter Alston resigned abruptly near the end of the season and was replaced by Tommy Lasorda who would manage the team for two decades himself.

Offseason 
 November 17, 1975: Jimmy Wynn, Tom Paciorek, Lee Lacy and Jerry Royster were traded by the Dodgers to the Atlanta Braves for Dusty Baker and Ed Goodson.
 December 23, 1975: Bob Randall was traded by the Dodgers to the Minnesota Twins for Danny Walton.
 March 2: Willie Crawford was traded by the Dodgers to the St. Louis Cardinals for Ted Sizemore.
 March 2: Ken McMullen was released by the Dodgers.
 March 31: Orlando Alvarez and cash were traded by the Dodgers to the California Angels for Ellie Rodríguez.

Regular season

Season standings

Record vs. opponents

Opening Day lineup

Notable transactions 
 June 15: Joe Ferguson, Bob Detherage and Fred Tisdale (minors) were traded by the Dodgers to the St. Louis Cardinals for Reggie Smith.
 June 23: Mike Marshall was traded by the Dodgers to the Atlanta Braves for Elías Sosa and Lee Lacy.

Roster

Player stats

Batting

Starters by position 
Note: Pos = Position; G = Games played; AB = At bats; H = Hits; Avg. = Batting average; HR = Home runs; RBI = Runs batted in

Other batters 
Note: G = Games played; AB = At bats; H = Hits; Avg. = Batting average; HR = Home runs; RBI = Runs batted in

Pitching

Starting pitchers 
Note: G = Games pitched; IP = Innings pitched; W = Wins; L = Losses; ERA = Earned run average; SO = Strikeouts

Other pitchers 
Note: G = Games pitched; IP = Innings pitched; W = Wins; L = Losses; ERA = Earned run average; SO = Strikeouts

Relief pitchers 
Note: G = Games pitched; W = Wins; L = Losses; SV = Saves; ERA = Earned run average; SO = Strikeouts

Awards and honors 
Gold Glove Award
Steve Garvey
Comeback Player of the Year Award
Tommy John
TSN National League All-Star
Don Sutton
NL Pitcher of the Month
Don Sutton (September 1976)
NL Player of the Month
Steve Garvey (September 1976)
NL Player of the Week
Steve Garvey (May 17–23)
Reggie Smith (July 5–11)
Doug Rau (July 19–25)
Don Sutton (Sep. 20–26)
Hutch Award
Tommy John

All-Stars 
1976 Major League Baseball All-Star Game
Steve Garvey, starter, first base
Ron Cey, reserve
Rick Rhoden, reserve
Bill Russell, reserve

Farm system

1976 Major League Baseball draft

The Dodgers drafted 41 players in the June draft and 14 in the January draft. Of those, ten players would eventually play in the Major Leagues.

The top draft pick in the June draft was catcher Mike Scioscia from Springfield High School in Pennsylvania. He would be the Dodgers starting catcher from 1980–1992 and was a 2-time All-Star and two-time World Series Champion with the Dodgers (1981 and 1988). After his playing career ended he became the manager of the Anaheim/Los Angeles Angels and would win another World Series as their manager in 2002.

Notes

References 
Baseball-Reference season page
Baseball Almanac season page

External links 
1976 Los Angeles Dodgers uniform
Los Angeles Dodgers official web site

Los Angeles Dodgers seasons
Los Angeles Dodgers season
Los Angel